La Musica Che Pesta is a double album by Italian DJ Gigi D'Agostino, released under the alias "Lento Violento Man" in 2007 through Media Records.

Track listing

CD 1
 "Mondo Dag 6"
 "The Maranza"
 "Quando Dico"
 "Reparto Presse"
 "Quoting"
 "Mondo Dag 7"
 "Danzaplano"
 "Distorsione Dag"
 "Vi Racconto"
 "Dago 3"
 "Consorzio Agrario"
 "Costruendo"
 "Mondo Dag 5"
 "E La Musica La Pesta"
 "Carica Lenta"
 "Picchia"
 "Puledrino"
 "Tempesta Nella Giungla"
 "Cicoria Lessa"

CD 2
 "Mondo Dag 9"
 "Zig Zag"
 "Ascolta"
 "Scusa"
 "Attrezzi E Accessori"
 "Carpe Dream"
 "Tresca Losca" [Ferramenta Mix]
 "Ok Man"
 "Mondo Dag 3"
 "Trabacando"
 "Contenuto Latente"
 "Scelta Tetanica" [Una Scelta Di Vita Mix]
 "Zappa E Aratro"
 "Scusa"
 "Viaggio Di Maggio"
 "Batte Forte"
 "Saldatrice Tamarra"
 "Hablando"
 "Ferro Fetente"
 "Taranza"

References

Gigi D'Agostino albums
2007 albums